Cyrtepistomus castaneus, the Asiatic oak weevil, is a species of oriental broad-nosed weevil in the beetle family Curculionidae. It is found in North America.

References

Further reading

External links

 

Entiminae
Articles created by Qbugbot
Beetles described in 1873